A Hardanger fiddle is a traditional stringed instrument considered to be the national instrument of Norway. In modern designs, this type of fiddle is very similar to the violin, though with eight or nine strings (rather than four as on a standard violin) and thinner wood. The F-holes of the Hardanger fiddle are distinctive, oftentimes with a more “sunken” appearance, and generally straighter edges (unlike the frilly, swirly F-holes of a violin). Four of the strings are strung and played like a violin, while the rest, named understrings or sympathetic strings, resonate under the influence of the other four. These extra strings are tuned and secured with extra pegs at the top of the scroll, effectively doubling the length of a Hardingfele scroll when compared to a violin. The sympathetic strings, once fastened to their pegs, are funneled through a “hollow” constructed fingerboard, which is built differently than a violin’s, being slightly higher and thicker to allow for these extra strings. The resonant strings lay on the center of the special bridge, attached to extra hooks (or fine-tuners) on the tailpiece. Carved out within the center of the bridge is a smaller secondary “bridge”, or opening, designed specifically for these resonant strings to pass through. This is where the resonance is picked up and reverberated; as notes are played, the vibrations are sent through the bridge, where the sympathetics echo those notes. 

The Hardingfele’s bridge is unique compared to other bowed instruments. It is somewhat taller and wider, resulting in the strings being slightly lower and farther apart; this allows for the easy execution of double-stops (playing of two strings at once). A similar technique is seen in some American old-time and bluegrass fiddlers, who intentionally move their bridge back a few millimetres closer to the tailpiece, for better double-stops.

The  is used for dancing, accompanied by rhythmic loud foot stomping. It was also traditional for the fiddler to lead the bridal procession to the church.

The instrument is often highly decorated, with a carved animal (usually a dragon or the Lion of Norway) or a carved woman's head as part of the scroll at the top of the pegbox, extensive mother of pearl inlay on the tailpiece and fingerboard, and black ink decorations called 'rosing' on the body of the instrument. Sometimes pieces of bone are used to decorate the pegs and the edges of the instrument.

Originally, the instrument had a rounder, narrower body. Around the year 1850, the modern layout with a body much like the violin became the norm.

Tunings

The notes given below for tunings are therefore relative to the 's written A, not to a concert A.

The understrings are tuned to vibrate according to the main tuning. For example, when the main strings are tuned A-D-A-E, the understrings are tuned B-D-E-F-A. The tuning largely depends on the region in which the instrument is being played, or the requirements of a particular tune.

In Norway, more than 20 different tunings are recorded. Most hardanger tunes are played in a common tuning (A-D-A-E). The hardanger fiddle can also be played in "low bass", the word "bass" referring to the lowest string, (G-D-A-E), the normal violin tuning. In certain regions the "Gorrlaus" (F-D-A-E) tuning is sometimes used. Many well-known players (such as Annbjørg Lien) frequently employ  E-scale tunings; i.e., instead of A-D-A-E, with tunes being mainly played in a D-scale, the instrument will be tuned to B-E-B-F#, so the tunes are mainly in an E-scale. Going higher still, the player Knut Buen recorded several albums in an F-scale tuning, C-F-C-G. This is possible only on a smaller-bodied instrument (such as a Hardanger fiddle), being rarely attempted on a standard full-sized violin. As a substitute, many fiddlers who play standard violins will simply tune their G string to A, using the A-D-A-E tuning, enabling them to play the same style of music.

Another tuning is called "troll tuning" (A-E-A-C). Troll tuning is used for the  tunes, also called the devil's tunes, as well as the tunes from the Kivlemøyane suite (thus associated with the hulderpeople as well as the devil); in the Valdres district of Norway, using this particular tuning is called "greylighting", a reminder that the fiddler tuned his fiddle like this when the morning was near, and he had played himself through a number of other tunings.

Legend has it that the fiddler learned  tunes from the devil. This tuning limits the melodic range of the tunes and is therefore sparsely used.

Technique
The technique of bowing a  also differs from that used with a violin. It's a smoother, bouncier style of bowing, with a lighter touch. The player usually bows on two of the upper strings at a time, and sometimes three. This is made easy by the relative flatness of the bridge, unlike the more curved bridge on a violin. The objective is to create a continuous sound of two (or more due to the sympathetic understrings) pitches. The strings of the fiddle are slimmer than those of the violin, resembling the strings of violins from the baroque period.

Here is an example of technique shown by Rose Logan with an instrument held at St Cecilia's Hall.

The Hardanger fiddle and religion
The  has had a long history with the Christian church. Well known early fiddle maker Isak Botnen is said to have learned some of his craft from church lay leader and school master Lars Klark, as well as the methods for varnishing from pastor Dedrik Muus. During religious revivals in the 1800s many fiddles (regular and Hardanger) were destroyed or hidden both by fiddlers and laypeople who thought "that it would be best for the soul that the fiddles be burned", as it was viewed as a "sinful instrument that encouraged wild dances, drinking and fights." This happened in Norway, as well as other parts of Europe, and until the 20th century playing a Hardanger fiddle in a church building was forbidden. Some fiddlers, however, played on, in spite of all condemnation, and thus valuable traditions remained intact. The first folk musicians to perform in a church were the fiddlers Johannes Dahle from Tinn, and Gjermund Haugen from Notodden. Dahle performed in the 1920s.

Known modern fiddler Annbjørg Lien has played with church organist Iver Kleive, but even she has experienced prejudice before performance from the religious side. Also, the oldest known fiddles still in existence can be heard accompanied by the oldest playable church pipe organ in Norway (originally built for an 18th-century church) on the album "" by Knut Hamre and Benedicte Maurseth.

Influences
Edvard Grieg adapted many Hardanger folk tunes into his compositions, and composed tunes for the Hardanger as part of his score for Ibsen's Peer Gynt Suite No. 1. The opening phrase of "Morning" from Grieg's Peer Gynt music is derived from the tuning of the sympathetic strings of the Hardanger fiddle: A F E D E F and so on.

In recent years, the instrument has gained recognition in the rest of the world. Japan has been one of the countries that has found an interest in the hardingfele and Japanese musicians travel to Norway just to learn to play this instrument. In 1997, the Australian classical composer Liza Lim wrote the piece Philtre for a solo Hardanger fiddle, and she also includes the instrument in her work Winding Bodies: 3 Knots (2013–14). Her string quartet The Weaver's Knot (2013–14) is inspired by the sound and performance techniques of Hardanger fiddle playing.
Another recent work is "mobius II" for hardanger fiddle and electronics by the British composer Rose Dodd (2011, premiered at the Huddersfield Contemporary Music Festival by Britt Pernille Froholm).

Players

In March 2010 Olav Luksengård Mjelva won the  Traditional music/Norwegian folk category (the Norwegian equivalent of the Grammy Awards), for his album .

Use in film
The Hardanger fiddle was used in the soundtracks of The Lord of the Rings: The Two Towers, and The Lord of the Rings: The Return of the King composed by Howard Shore, to provide the main voice for the Rohan theme. The use of the Hardanger fiddle in this movie, however, is far from traditional since the theme does not make noticeable use of the usual practice of bowing on two strings at a time for harmony as well as the fact that the violinist used vibrato, which is not traditionally used since the slight variance in pitch interferes with the sympathetic resonance of the under-strings. It was also used by composer John Powell and played by Dermot Crehan in the DreamWorks film How to Train Your Dragon for the main romantic theme.

The Hardanger fiddle is also featured in the soundtrack of Armageddon (composed by Trevor Rabin), and in Fargo (composed by Carter Burwell). In the latter, the context is a little more traditional—the main theme it plays is an arrangement of a Norwegian folk song entitled "The Lost Sheep".

Steven Van Zandt used the Hardanger fiddle in the theme song he wrote for the TV series Lilyhammer.

In the Japanese animated movie Tales from Earthsea it is played by Rio Yamase.

The Hardanger fiddle is featured in the soundtrack of the 2017 film Dunkirk, as well as the soundtrack for the 2021 Loki series.

See also
 , a Swedish fiddle with two sympathetic strings
 
 Kontra
 Stroh violin

References

References 
Aksdal, Bjørn, and Sven Nyhus. Fanitullen: Innføring i norsk og samisk folkemusikk. Oslo: Universitetsforlag.
Broughton, Simon, and Mark Ellingham. Rough Guide to World Music Volume One: Africa, Europe & the Middle East. London: Penguin Books, 1999. 212-216.
George, Patrice. "Knut Hamre and Benedicte Maurseth - Rosa I Botnen." RootsWorld. 26 Feb. 2008 http://www.rootsworld.com/reviews/botnen06.shtml
Gurvin, Olav. 1958. Hardingfela. In Hardingfeleslåttar, ed. Olav Gurvin. Norsk Folkemusikk, ser. 1 vol I. Oslo: Universitetsforslaget.
Sandvik, Sverre. Vi Byggjer Hardingfele. Tiden, 1983. 12-13. English translation "(How) We Build the Hardanger Fiddle" by Eldon Ellingson

External links 

 Hardanger Fiddle Association of America
 Fashioning the Hardanger Fiddle
 Hardingfeleverket--Norsk folkemusikk serie 1: Hardingfeleslåttar – i syv bind og Feleverket--Norsk folkemusikk serie 2: Slåtter for vanlig fele –  i fire bind
 Hardanger Fiddle, Isak N. Botnen/Skår (Norwegian, 1669–1759) and Trond Isaksen Flatebø (Norwegian, 1713–1772) made in 1756
 Hardanger Fiddle, Norway, 1786
Scordatura: The Dahle Tradition (Anne Svånaug Haugan. Etnisk Musikklubb: EM26) 
Andrea Hoag, Loretta Kelley, Charlie Pilzer
hardanger fiddler Christian Borlaug

Norwegian musical instruments
String instruments with sympathetic strings
Nordic folk music
Fiddles